2 A.M. Wakeup Call is the second album from the band Tweaker. Opposed to The Attraction to All Things Uncertain, this album captures emotional, human performances and instrumentation - notably live drums, acoustic guitar, piano and glockenspiels.  It's a nighttime record about dreams, nightmares, and insomnia—things that keep us up at night.

Vrenna has stated in interviews that the title was inspired by his wife's insomnia. For a period of about a month she would wake up at 2am every single night no matter when they went to bed.

2 a.m. Wakeup Call was subsequently released in 5.1 Surround Sound.

The track It's Still Happening was offered to the ACIDplanet community for remixing as a part of the Tweaker 2 Remix contest.

Track listing

Personnel
Chris Vrenna - producer, recording engineer, mixing engineer
Clint Walsh - producer 
Jeff Antebi - executive producer
Johnny Marr - guitar on track 11
Paul Ill - bass on track 3; fretless bass on track 12
Rich Mouser - recorded additional live drums on tracks 1 and 10
Ken Lee - mastering engineer

References

2004 albums
Albums produced by Chris Vrenna
Tweaker (band) albums
Waxploitation Records albums